Guaitil is a district of the Acosta canton, in the San José province of Costa Rica.

Geography 
Guaitil has an area of  km² and an elevation of  metres.

The southern boundary of the district is the Grande de Candelaria River, and the northern boundary is the Jorco River.

Communities
Within Guaitil District are the villages of Coyolar, La Cruz, Ococa, and Toledo.

Demographics 

For the 2011 census, Guaitil had a population of  inhabitants.

Transportation

Road transportation 
The district is covered by the following road routes:
 National Route 301

References 

Districts of San José Province
Populated places in San José Province